Sommerach is a municipality  in the district of Kitzingen in Bavaria in Germany.

Geography 
Sommerach is located on the southern part of the river Main loop on the so-called Wine Island ("Weininsel"). It is 3 km (2 mi.) away from the motorway A3 (exit Kitzingen/Schwarzach/Volkach).

References

Kitzingen (district)